Bruce A. Tate is an American author on the topic of the Java, Ruby, and Elixir programming languages and other computer software. He is also the CTO of icanmakeitbetter.com and the editor of Elixir books for the Pragmatic Bookshelf.

Works

 Adopting Elixir
 Better, Faster, Lighter Java
 Beyond Java: A Glimpse at the Future of Programming Languages
 Bitter EJB, co-authored a critical analysis of Java EJBs
 Bitter Java, a critical analysis of Java
 Deploying Rails Applications
 From Java to Ruby: Things Every Manager Should Know
 Programming Phoenix
 Rails: Up and Running
 Seven Languages in Seven Weeks
 Seven More Languages in Seven Weeks

References

External links 
 Review of Tate's book Beyond Java
 Weblog
 Amazon book review and listings
 Tursiops electronicus: Stimulated tutoring of a language trained dolphin interview in the free Prolog chapter of Seven Languages in Seven Weeks.

American non-fiction writers
Living people
Year of birth missing (living people)